Chembukkavu (Chembookavu or Chembukavu) is a residential area situated in the City of Thrissur in Kerala state of India. Chembukkavu is Ward 6 of Thrissur Municipal Corporation.Famous for housing the Thrissur Zoo, Chembukkavu is a bustling urban area part of the Thrissur city. Chembukkavu Bhagavathy Temple also takes part in the Thrissur Pooram making it a site of pilgrimage for people from all parts of Kerala during the months of April and May.

Toponymy 
Chembukkavu takes its name from the Nambudiri family's mana(Illam)with the same name. It stood on Mana Lane before it was demolished in 2011.

Notable People 

Biju Menon Popular Indian Movie Personality.
Rajan Pallan Former Mayor Thrissur.
Bhavana Popular Indian Movie Personality.

References

See also
Thrissur
Thrissur District
List of Thrissur Corporation wards

Suburbs of Thrissur city